Chad Perkins (born June 22, 1978) is an American politician, radio host and police officer from Bowling Green, Missouri. A member of the Republican Party, he has served in the Missouri House of Representatives since 2021. He represents the 40th district, which includes all of Pike and part of Lincoln counties in northeastern Missouri. Previously, Perkins served as the mayor of Bowling Green.

Background 
Perkins was born June 22, 1978, in Hannibal, Missouri. He graduated from Bowling Green High School in 1997, attended John Wood Community College from 1997–1999 and the University of Missouri from 2000–2001. Perkins has worked as an on-air radio host at KJFM Radio since 2001, is a deputy sheriff for the Pike County Sheriff's Department, and is a former mayor of Bowling Green. As of May 27, 2021, Perkins' police license was not active.

Political career 
Perkins won the Republican primary election in August 2020 to replace fellow Republican incumbent Jim Hansen, who could not seek reelection due to Missouri's constitutional term limits. There was no Democrat running for the 40th District.

On May 27, 2021, the St. Louis Post-Dispatch reported that when Perkins was working as a police officer in 2015, a report alleged he had received a "sexual favor" from an intoxicated 19-year-old. The woman also asked Perkins to help her get alcohol and the prescription drug Adderall. The report also said Pike County Sheriff Stephen Korte had obstructed a probe into Perkins as he was running for office, saying "do everything we can to get Chad elected". Perkins said their relationship was consensual and called the controversy "political sour grapes" from a personal feud with Frankford, Missouri police chief Josh Baker. Speaker of the House Rob Vescovo said he had been made aware of the report and had forwarded information to the House Ethics Committee, and Sirena Wissler, the civil rights coordinator of the United States Department of Justice's St. Louis office, said she had forwarded information to the FBI and said Perkins "needs to get the hell out of the legislature". The Missouri State Highway Patrol began reviewing the allegations.

Electoral history

References

External links 
Official website
Campaign website

1978 births
Living people
American police officers
John Wood Community College people
Mayors of places in Missouri
Republican Party members of the Missouri House of Representatives
People from Bowling Green, Missouri
People from Hannibal, Missouri
Radio personalities from Missouri
University of Missouri alumni